Augustus Sinclair is a fictional character in the 2K 2010 video game BioShock 2. Within the game, he was one of the leading figures in Rapture's genetics industry and an important businessman. Described as an example of moral relativism, Sinclair plays a significant role in BioShock 2, guiding the player to Eleanor Lamb. He speaks with a characteristic Tidewater accent, voiced by Doug Boyd.

Development

Concept and creation 
The last name "Sinclair" was inspired by BioShock'''s art director Scott Sinclair. The surname 'Sinclair' can be seen/heard multiple times in BioShock. These subtle homages to Scott Sinclair were later used in BioShock 2 as a basis to create a much broader character which ultimately became Augustus Sinclair.

Jordan Thomas, BioShock 2s creative director outlines what Sinclair was conceived as; "he is self-interest incarnate. He is the kind of guy who will play absolutely any side against the middle." Sinclair's selfishness was intented to contrast with the selflessness motivating the philosophy behind main antagonist Sofia Lamb, whom Thomas describes as "a staunch altruist," adding that Sinclair's "capitalistic tendencies put him at odds with Lamb." Bioshock 2s lead level-designer, J.P. LeBreton, further outlines Sinclair's personality and ethics "Sinclair is this guy who contacts you early on because he realizes that you and he have a common interest. […] Friendly but sort of shady, he's part of this organization that gets stuff done no matter the costs ethically. He's a pragmatist who sits in contrast with the other characters of the world, who are ideologues."

BioShocks director Ken Levine states that his original incarnation of Atlas, like Sinclair, had an accent from the American South. This version of Atlas was later dropped as it proved unpopular at playtests. Levine comments that "they didn't trust him, and if they didn't trust him, we were screwed." Atlas was later given a Dublin accent, perceived as more trustworthy. Sinclair, a character conceived as 'shady' (in the words of LeBreton), who took on Atlas' role as the players' guide in BioShock 2, would go on to possess the accent originally intended for Atlas.

 Design and appearance 
Animation supervisor Jeff Weir states that "Sinclair was actually one of the hardest characters for us to get down for some reason. He started as a kind of Desi Arnaz type, but I don't know if that seed idea ended up being a perfect fit because in the end the character was someone who was decidedly self-serving and I don't know if the design informed that as well as it could have". Brendan George, 2K Australia's character modeler adds that "my main inspiration for Sinclair was from working on BioShock and the concepts that Colin [Fix] did. I came onto the project halfway through production so most of the artistic goals were already put in place. […] As for Sinclair, I tried to make sure the fidelity was quite high. I think we've done a great job; making sure their faces are constructed correctly."

Sinclair ultimately appears in-game with his hair slicked back, wearing a white shirt and a red and orange striped tie, with suspenders, cuff links and a tie clip as accessories. He has a revolver in a shoulder holster, along with a military style waist pack. In the later stages of BioShock 2, when the character is transformed into an Alpha Series (a type of Big Daddy), known as Subject Omega, Sinclair's design differs subtlely from previous Alpha Series the player encounters. He is painted black and silver, along with visible Omega (Ω) symbols on both hands. Omega being the last letter of the Greek alphabet, reflecting Sinclair's status in-game as last of the Alpha Series.

 Characteristics 
Jordan Thomas, BioShock 2s creative director describes Sinclair:
"Augustus Sinclair, who founded Sinclair Solutions, and unlike Fontaine and Ryan he never had aspirations to control the city. He was a very low key guy who liked to walk between worlds, and for him, there was never too dirty a job."

Sinclair is portrayed as a self-serving, amoral businessman, motivated solely by profit. He is not an ideologue like Andrew Ryan or Sofia Lamb—holding no strong political convictions—although equally he's not a "pure" nihilist, like Frank Fontaine. Like Ryan, he rejects altruism, and, as a self-made businessman, embraces capitalism, but mocks Ryan's deep infatuation with the free market, describing it as "a big fat hooker too dim to spot a wooden nickel." Sinclair's rejection of the free market, combined with his "spineless moral relativism" as Ryan terms it, manifests itself in the form of devious business practices, such as pyramid schemes and fraud, showing little to no remorse for the people he swindles in the process. He wasn't driven by a lust for power, or by ideology, simply out of self-interest and a desire to "strike it rich".

Sinclair is charismatic and affable, something touched upon by reviewers, and addresses the player with a friendly disposition. His motive in helping the player initially is pragmatic rather than altruistic, as the two share similar goals. He respects the player as a capable partner and appears to show genuine concern for their well-being, especially after the player saves his life. Throughout BioShock 2, he makes no attempt to hide his moral biases. His advice to the player characteristically lacks any sense of morality, usually recommending the player make choices for their greatest personal benefit. If the player kills specific unarmed NPCs (when the player is not required to do so), Sinclair will make no serious qualm about it—even justifying the players' action as necessary for survival in Rapture.

 Role in BioShock 
 Character history 
Augustus Sinclair was born in Panama, some time before the opening of the Panama Canal in 1914. His grandfather, an altruist, worked on the construction of the canal, believing he was doing a service for his fellow man. He was killed by drowning (presumably in an accident) during the canal's construction, which became the impetus of Sinclair's selfish outlook. Sinclair eventually immigrated to the United States, to Georgia, with the hopes of becoming a successful businessman. When Andrew Ryan created Rapture in 1946, Sinclair saw it as an invitation to better himself financially. Prior to the Rapture civil war in 1959, between Atlas and Andrew Ryan, Sinclair spearheaded Sinclair Solutions, a leading business in the genetics industry and was one of the richest, most influential people in the city.

Andrew Ryan was never particularly fond of Sinclair, describing him as "what happens when spineless moral relativism is spun into a business ethic. The man has a dirty finger in each and every pie", but nonetheless the two businessmen remained close associates. It is implied Ryan only contracted Sinclair Solutions to carry out activities considered too damaging for his own firm to be linked with. Sinclair even established a private prison, the Persephone detention facility, knowing that Ryan would pay him to remove anyone who "wasn't workin' out." Persephone also doubled as the secret headquarters of Sinclair Solutions, who were contracted by Ryan to provide subjects from amongst the prison population to be forcibly converted into Big Daddies. At Ryan's request, BioShock 2'''s main antagonist Sofia Lamb was imprisoned at Persephone and left under Sinclair's jurisdiction. Ultimately, however, Lamb rallied the prisoners against him, ousting Sinclair and assumed control of Persephone herself.

 BioShock 
Sinclair does not appear directly in the original BioShock game. However, the surname 'Sinclair' is seen several times, as well as heard in the audio diaries of other characters. The most prominent example would be the business 'Sinclair Spirits' encountered within the 'Fort Frolic' level. Promotional content released on 2K's website shortly before BioShock's 2s release confirmed that Sinclair Spirits belonged to Augustus Sinclair.

 BioShock 2 
Sinclair stayed in hiding after Ryan's downfall and Sofia Lamb's ascent to power, unable to reach his submersible in Persephone (which has since become Sofia Lamb's base of operations) to escape from the city. Taking place in 1968, he has by this point become an associate of Brigid Tenenbaum, who introduces the player to Sinclair over the radio. Sinclair features as Subject Delta's (the player's character in BioShock 2) guide, showing Delta points of interest and providing personal interjections throughout the vast majority of the game. Like Ryan and Atlas/Fontaine in the previous installment, Sinclair is seen in person very little but still plays a prominent and vital role in the plot; usually via radio and audio diaries that the player finds throughout Rapture.

Initially, Sinclair's motive in helping Delta is purely selfish, wishing to exploit the advanced technology of Rapture for his own personal gain on the surface and cannot escape the city without Delta's help. He never hides this from Delta, however, and is open with him in regards to his immoral plans, knowing that Delta also needs his assistance if he is to reach Eleanor Lamb—who is also located in Persephone.

Sinclair and Delta plan to reach Persephone mainly via train, but various obstacles force them to stop repeatedly. Delta ventures into the city to deal with these problems, whilst Sinclair stays behind in the train and guides Delta via radio. In one instance, the train is attacked, and Sinclair and Delta are separated. The train, with Sinclair inside, is trapped within a submerged section of the city with limited air left. Delta is able to drain the flooding not long before Sinclair dies of asphyxiation.

Throughout their journey, it is gradually revealed to the player that Sinclair was the one ultimately responsible for Delta becoming an Alpha Series (an early type of Big Daddy). Delta was once known as 'Johnny Topside', a deep-sea diver who discovered Rapture by accident many years ago, and accused of being a government spy by Andrew Ryan. As a consequence, he was imprisoned at Persephone by Sinclair, after Ryan paid him to do so. He was eventually supplied as an unwilling candidate to the 'protector programme', and subsequently converted into one of the earliest Big Daddies as a result. Sinclair, however, didn't specifically request for Delta to be chosen.
 	 
When Delta and Sinclair eventually reach Persephone, during the final stages of the game, Sinclair vanishes for some time. It is revealed that Sinclair was captured by Sofia Lamb and transformed against his will, like Subject Delta, into an Alpha Series. Sinclair, now referred to as 'Subject Omega' by Lamb, is compelled to obey Lamb's every command as a result of mental conditioning forced upon him during the procedure. Sinclair, however, can still speak and think for himself. Sinclair continues to give Delta help over the radio, but is unable to hand Delta the key necessary to escape. He apologies to Delta for what he did to him in the past, and surmises that he probably deserves what's happened to him. Knowing what he has become, he tells Delta he no longer wishes to live, and asks Delta to end his life. Due to Sofia Lamb's brainwashing, Sinclair is forced to fight Delta, but Delta manages to kill him and retrieve the key. He thanks Delta with his dying breath. Delta and Eleanor then escape to the surface in Sinclair's submersible.

 Multiplayer 
In regards to Sinclair's role in the multiplayer aspect of BioShock 2, which is set before the events of BioShock, Senior Producer Melissa Miller explains "While Sinclair is the chief character in the multiplayer game, he doesn't actually physically show up, but his presence is very much felt because the citizens of Rapture have enrolled in his 'Sinclair Solutions Home Consumers Rewards Club' - this pyramid scheme he has started up in order to promise these people new cutting-edge plasmid weapon technology."

 BioShock: Rapture 

Sinclair features in the John Shirley prequel novel BioShock: Rapture.

 Promotion and merchandise 

Sinclair was frequently mentioned by creative director Jordan Thomas in promotional interviews given prior to the release of BioShock 2.On January 14, 2010, shortly prior to the release of BioShock 2, 3 listenable audio diaries of Augustus Sinclair were released on 2K's website to promote the game. These were non-game content that contained "real story info". The recordings gave an insight into Sinclair's business practices, as well as his life before arriving in Rapture. They are no longer available on 2K's website, however.

NECA produced a 7" figurine of Sinclair in his 'Big Daddy' form as Subject Omega to tie-in with the release of the game.

 Reception 
Sinclair has overall been well received by critics who note the character's likeability, despite his questionable morals. Jordan Thomas states "he is not a pure nihilist like Fontaine, but he is continually redefining the rules on the fly. He is closer to one of us; the difference is that he does not scruple at much – he's affably monstrous from time to time. He's a useful ally to you, sure, but he wants to sell off Rapture block by block." He also says "Sinclair - who appears prominently in both the single-player and multiplayer versions of the game - is a good example of moral relativism."  Softpedia add "the moral relativism [Thomas] mentioned is mostly derived from [Sinclair's] binary nature, the character being neither good, nor bad, as he can't be labelled as neither a hero nor a villain." Jennifer Culp agrees with Thomas' assessment of Sinclair as "affably monstrous," saying "I find that description quite apt." She goes on to positively describe the moral relativism of the character, noting "Sinclair’s forthright declarations about his own motives and transparent moral adjustments as his goals shift, however, are disarming and occasionally downright endearing."

Eurogamer note the "prevailing sense of time and nostalgia apparent in Rapture. […] A time when every man wore a hat and suit and the language was full of quirky phrases." Highlighting Sinclair's penchant for addressing the player as 'sport' as a prime example of this. Samuel Nunn also acknowledges this, adding "In particular I personally love Augustus Sinclair’s snappy city-slick chatter, and his phrases and lines feel like they’ve come right out of the 20’s. All in all, the audio does its job extremely well." The Hairpin take a similar view, adding "Sinclair’s voice acting doesn’t hurt. He sounds so skeevy, and yet somehow so charismatic." Further adding "Voice actor Doug Boyd performed a miracle in this case, though; Sinclair sounds like my 96-year-old grandmother filtered through a middle-aged guy who really loves capitalism, and it is somehow bizarrely attractive. Maybe it’s because of the game’s sense of loneliness in fabulous environs populated only with scary enemies?" The Escapist also share these sentiments, writing "Sinclair’s Southern drawl and charismatic pragmatism play wonderfully as he serves as both angel and devil on your shoulder, making his more redeeming moments all the more impactful. Conversely, Peter Chapman writes that "Sinclair does not have the charm of our Irish friend, Atlas."

Jennifer Culp writes that of BioShock 2s characters "one of the most entertaining is Augustus Sinclair, who you don’t hear from in the first game. You do, however, see evidence of his influence. You hear about him in other people’s audio diaries, you see his name on storefronts, the name 'Sinclair' (spelled out in a gloriously Art Deco font, of course) seeps into your brain. And then shortly after beginning BioShock 2, he starts talking to you! He is, of course, a terrible person. He’s a slumlord in Pauper’s Drop and uses his residents as cheap labor sources to assemble products he later upsells, while offering them a slight discount at his liquor chain in order to lure their business and regain his meagre investment in their efforts. He built a private prison, Persephone, to house political dissidents for profit, and was directly involved in spying operations that placed certain people under arrest. He further profited from political unrest in Rapture by running a 'consumer rewards testing program' which basically allowed citizens to murder one another in the streets in the service of 'testing' his 'home defence' products. He’s a pretty bad dude. Somehow, though, he’s just so damn charming about all of it." Simon Smith takes a similar view, adding "I was initially weary of this character, by his nature he is a businessman looking to get whatever he can although he did grow on me as the story continued."

Eurogamer retrospectively views Sinclair positively. They write "BioShock 2 offers a more nuanced take. Take Augustus Sinclair, its Fontaine equivalent - a ruthless businessman who makes no secret of his plan to pick Rapture clean for profit. By audiologs and his own free admission, he's a career bastard and proud of it. Even so, when you go up against an elderly rival called Grace Holloway who's both actively trying to kill you and previously gave him a bloody nose by kicking him out of his own hotel, he makes a point of reminding you that her beef with you at least is based on a misunderstanding rather than malice, and goes so far as to non-sarcastically call you a bigger man than him if you spare her." Andrew Carroll writes that although Sinclair may be a weaker character when compared to others from the previous game, such as Fontaine or Sander Cohen— he is still among the best characters of BioShock 2. Richard Cobbett goes on to highlight that in some ways Sinclair is one of the more relatable characters. He adds "ruthless as he is, he's not a cardboard cutout. He's also one of the few BioShock characters with the self-awareness to know when it's time to drop the philosophy textbooks and have a human response to what fate has in store. None of this makes him a 'good' guy, but they do make him more than just another ideology given flesh." Zoe Delahunty-Light compares Sinclair with The Evil Within 2s Liam O'Neal, stating "with both Augustus and Liam, you knew them before they were brainwashed, when they were helpful buddies who guided you through the equally distorted worlds of Rapture and Union. They were humans first, monsters second."

WhatCulture placed Sinclair #5 on their top 10 list of gaming characters who never deserved to die. They add "Sinclair, for assisting Subject Delta, is subject to the same gruesome experiments […] that Delta was, thus turning him into a mind-controlled freak - just like you. Because that large golden key in his hand is required to exit, you, Subject Delta, are forced to euthanize (Read: violently, explosively kill) Sinclair in order to exit Rapture. Now, considering the hordes of Splicers you've already decimated, his death technically IS just another in a Rapture bloodbath, but considering the precious few people who actually don't want to rip your guts out, let alone go out of the way to help you, this death stood out." However, Stephen Beirne was somewhat more critical of the way the game handles Sinclair's death. He writes "If it happens that you actually feel morose at the death of Sinclair, the moment may go unnoticed. As for me, the silent protagonist merely stared at Eleanor with utter vapidity while my television substituted to hear my say on the matter." On the other hand, Vice praises the "joyful, B-movie excess" of BioShock 2, writing "play the scene where Sinclair, your comrade, is transformed into a Big Daddy and try not to smile."

See also 
 List of characters in the BioShock series
 Andrew Ryan

References 

 	 

Fictional businesspeople in video games
BioShock (series) characters
Video game characters introduced in 2010
Fictional Caribbean people